During the 1959–60 English football season, Brentford competed in the Football League Third Division. A strong run in the final 13 matches of the season lifted the Bees from mid-table to a 6th-place finish.

Season summary 
After two strong pushes for promotion from the Third Division, Brentford manager Malky MacDonald conducted little transfer business in the 1959 off-season, with his main signing being that of former Chelsea centre half Bill Livingstone as cover for the injured Ian Dargie. However, two youngsters MacDonald signed from Scotland in June and July 1959 between them would go on to make nearly 700 appearances for the club – Tommy Higginson and John Docherty. As a testament how little the squad had changed over the previous three years, by the end of the season MacDonald had 12 players on the books who had all made over 100 appearances for Brentford – Cakebread, Wilson, Horne, Coote, Bristow, Goundry, Dargie, Parsons, Heath, Rainford, Francis and Towers.

Despite runs of one defeat in seven matches in August and September 1959 and six wins in seven matches in October, Brentford had uneven first half of the season and were rooted firmly in mid-table at the turn of the year. Jim Towers became the Bees' record Football League goalscorer courtesy of a hattrick in a 3–0 defeat of Accrington Stanley on 24 October 1959 and he had taken 19 fewer matches to pass Jack Holliday's record. Towers' strike partner George Francis followed up with a hattrick in a 4–2 derby victory over rivals Queens Park Rangers and eclipsed that performance with a four-goal haul in a 5–0 FA Cup first round victory over non-league club Ashford Town on 14 November. With the Brentford's so-so league form, the FA Cup looked to be the focus of the Bees' efforts, but they met their end in the following round versus Fourth Division club Exeter City.

Brentford welcomed the 1960s with a 2–0 defeat to the eventual-promoted side Southampton at The Dell on 2 January 1960 and continued to muddle through to March, when a 1–0 victory over Bournemouth & Boscombe Athletic on the 5th of the month kicked off a strong run which would last until the end of the season. In the remaining 13 matches of the campaign, George Francis and Jim Towers each scored eight goals to fire Brentford to a 6th-place finish. Francis ended the season as top scorer with 31 goals, the second time he had managed to better his fellow "Terrible Twin" Towers' total.

League table

Results 
 Brentford's goal tally listed first.

Legend

Football League Third Division

FA Cup 

 Sources: 100 Years Of Brentford, Statto

Playing squad 
 Players' ages are as of the opening day of the 1959–60 season.

 Sources: 100 Years Of Brentford, Timeless Bees

Coaching staff

Statistics

Appearances and goals 

 Players listed in italics left the club mid-season.
 Source: 100 Years Of Brentford

Goalscorers 

 Players listed in italics left the club mid-season.
 Source: 100 Years Of Brentford

Management

Summary

Transfers and loans

Notes

References 

Brentford F.C. seasons
Brentford